A temporal paradox, time paradox, or time travel paradox is a paradox, an apparent contradiction, or logical contradiction associated with the idea of time and time travel. While the notion of time travel to the future complies with current understanding of physics via relativistic time dilation, temporal paradoxes arise from circumstances involving hypothetical time travel to the past – and are often used to demonstrate its impossibility. In physics, temporal paradoxes fall into two broad groups: consistency paradoxes exemplified by the grandfather paradox; and causal loops. Other paradoxes associated with time travel are a variation of the Fermi paradox and paradoxes of free will that stem from causal loops such as Newcomb's paradox.

Causal loop

A causal loop is a paradox of time travel that occurs when a future event is the cause of a past event, which in turn is the cause of the future event. Both events then exist in spacetime, but their origin cannot be determined. A causal loop may involve an event, a person or object, or information. The terms boot-strap paradox, predestination paradox or ontological paradox are sometimes used in fiction to refer to a causal loop.

Grandfather paradox
The consistency paradox or grandfather paradox occurs when the past is changed in any way, thus creating a contradiction. A common example given is travelling to the past and intervening with the conception of one's ancestors (such as causing the death of the parent beforehand), thus affecting the conception of oneself. If the time traveller were not born, then it would not be possible for them to undertake such an act in the first place. Therefore, the ancestor lives to offspring the time traveller's next-generation ancestor, and eventually the time traveller. There is thus no predicted outcome to this. Consistency paradoxes occur whenever changing the past is possible.

A possible resolution is that a time traveller can do anything that did happen, but cannot do anything that did not happen. Doing something that did not happen results in a contradiction. This is referred to as the Novikov self-consistency principle.

Early examples 
A form of the paradox is described in a letter printed in the July 1927 issue of Amazing Stories, which suggests that a time traveller could shoot and kill his younger self.  A similar scenario is presented in Charles Cloukey's "Paradox" (Amazing Stories Quarterly, Summer 1929), wherein the protagonist has the opportunity to avert the events that sent him back in time.  Relating this predicament to other characters, the time traveller offers a hypothetical example in which he might have travelled to his grandfather's childhood to kill him.  One of the listeners remarks that he has heard "that grandfather argument" previously.  Later that year, an editorial note in Science Wonder Stories invited readers to discuss the problem of travelling back 200 years to shoot one's great-great-great-grandfather.

By the early 1930s, the topic was frequently discussed in the lettercolumns of various American science fiction magazines.   A 1931 Amazing Stories letter characterizes the matter as "the age-old argument of preventing your birth by killing your grandparents" Early science-fiction stories dealing with the paradox are the short story Ancestral Voices by Nathaniel Schachner, published in 1933, and the 1944 book Future Times Three by René Barjavel, although a number of other works from the 1930s and 1940s touched upon the topic in various degrees of detail.

Variants 
The grandfather paradox encompasses any change to the past, and it is presented in many variations. Physicist John Garrison et al. give a variation of the paradox of an electronic circuit that sends a signal through a time machine to shut itself off, and receives the signal before it sends it. An equivalent paradox is known in philosophy as the "retro-suicide paradox" or "autoinfanticide", going back in time and killing a younger version of oneself (such as a baby). Another variant of the grandfather paradox is the "Hitler paradox" or "Hitler's murder paradox", a fairly frequent trope in science fiction, in which the protagonist travels back in time to murder Adolf Hitler before he can instigate World War II and the Holocaust. Rather than necessarily physically preventing time travel, the action removes any reason for the travel, along with any knowledge that the reason ever existed. Additionally, the consequences of Hitler's existence are so monumental and all-encompassing that for anyone born after the war, it is likely that their birth was influenced in some way by its effects, and thus the lineage aspect of the paradox would directly apply in some way.

Some advocate a parallel universe approach to the grandfather paradox. When the time traveller kills their grandfather, the traveller is actually killing a parallel universe version of the grandfather, and the time traveller's original universe is unaltered; it has been argued that since the traveller arrives in a different universe's history and not their own history, this is not "genuine" time travel. In other variants, the actions of time travellers have no effects outside of their own personal experience, as depicted in Alfred Bester's short story The Men Who Murdered Mohammed.

Fermi paradox

The Fermi paradox can be adapted for time travel, and phrased "if time travel were possible, where are all the visitors from the future?" Answers vary, from time travel not being possible, to the possibility that visitors from the future cannot reach any arbitrary point in the past, or that they disguise themselves to avoid detection.

Newcomb's paradox

Newcomb's paradox is a thought experiment showing an apparent contradiction between the expected utility principle and the strategic dominance principle. The thought experiment is often extended to explore causality and free will by allowing for "perfect predictors": if perfect predictors of the future exist, for example if time travel exists as a mechanism for making perfect predictions, then perfect predictions appear to contradict free will because decisions apparently made with free will are already known to the perfect predictor.

Philosophical analysis 
Even without knowing whether time travel to the past is physically possible, it is possible to show using modal logic that changing the past results in a logical contradiction. If it is necessarily true that the past happened in a certain way, then it is false and impossible for the past to have occurred in any other way. A time traveller would not be able to change the past from the way it is; they would only act in a way that is already consistent with what necessarily happened.

Consideration of the grandfather paradox has led some to the idea that time travel is by its very nature paradoxical and therefore logically impossible. For example, the philosopher Bradley Dowden made this sort of argument in the textbook Logical Reasoning, arguing that the possibility of creating a contradiction rules out time travel to the past entirely. However, some philosophers and scientists believe that time travel into the past need not be logically impossible provided that there is no possibility of changing the past, as suggested, for example, by the Novikov self-consistency principle. Dowden revised his view after being convinced of this in an exchange with the philosopher Norman Swartz.

General relativity 
Consideration of the possibility of backward time travel in a hypothetical universe described by a Gödel metric led famed logician Kurt Gödel to assert that time might itself be a sort of illusion. He suggests something along the lines of the block time view, in which time is just another dimension like space, with all events at all times being fixed within this four-dimensional "block".

Causal loops 

Backward time travel that does not create a grandfather paradox creates a causal loop. The Novikov self-consistency principle expresses one view as to how backward time travel would be possible without the generation of paradoxes. According to this hypothesis, physics in or near closed timelike curves (time machines) can only be consistent with the universal laws of physics, and thus only self-consistent events can occur. Anything a time traveller does in the past must have been part of history all along, and the time traveller can never do anything to prevent the trip back in time from happening, since this would represent an inconsistency. Novikov et al. used the example given by physicist Joseph Polchinski for the grandfather paradox, that of a billiard ball heading toward a time machine. The ball's older self emerges from the time machine and strikes its younger self so that its younger self never enters the time machine. Novikov et al. showed how this system can be solved in a self-consistent way that avoids the grandfather paradox, though it creates a causal loop. Some physicists suggest that causal loops only exist in the quantum scale, in a fashion similar to that of the chronology protection conjecture proposed by Stephen Hawking, so histories over larger scales are not looped. Another conjecture, the cosmic censorship hypothesis, suggests that every closed timelike curve passes through an event horizon, which prevents such causal loops from being observed.

Seth Lloyd and other researchers at MIT have proposed an expanded version of the Novikov principle by which probability bends to prevent paradoxes from occurring. Outcomes would become stranger as one approaches a forbidden act, as the universe must favor improbable events to prevent impossible ones.

Quantum physics 
Some physicists, such as Daniel Greenberger, and David Deutsch, have proposed that quantum theory allows for time travel where the past must be self-consistent. Deutsch argues that quantum computation with a negative delay—backward time travel—produces only self-consistent solutions, and the chronology-violating region imposes constraints that are not apparent through classical reasoning. In 2014, researchers published a simulation validating Deutsch's model with photons. Deutsch uses the terminology of "multiple universes" in his paper in an effort to express the quantum phenomena, but notes that this terminology is unsatisfactory. Others have taken this to mean that "Deutschian" time travel involves the time traveller emerging in a different universe, which avoids the grandfather paradox.

The interacting-multiple-universes approach is a variation of Everett's many-worlds interpretation (MWI) of quantum mechanics. It involves time travellers arriving in a different universe than the one from which they came; it has been argued that, since travellers arrive in a different universe's history and not their own history, this is not "genuine" time travel. Stephen Hawking has argued that even if the MWI is correct, we should expect each time traveller to experience a single self-consistent history, so that time travellers remain within their own world rather than travelling to a different one. Allen Everett argued that Deutsch's approach "involves modifying fundamental principles of quantum mechanics; it certainly goes beyond simply adopting the MWI", and that even if Deutsch's approach is correct, it would imply that any macroscopic object composed of multiple particles would be split apart when traveling back in time, with different particles emerging in different worlds.

However, it was shown in an article by Tolksdorf and Verch that Deutsch's CTC  self-consistency condition can be fulfilled to arbitrary precision in any quantum system described according to relativistic quantum field theory on spacetimes where CTCs are excluded, casting doubts on whether Deutsch's condition is really characteristic of quantum processes mimicking CTCs in the sense of general relativity. In a later article, the same authors have shown that  Deutsch's CTC fixed point condition can also be fulfilled in any system subject to the laws of classical statistical mechanics, even if it is not built up by quantum systems. The authors conclude that hence, Deutsch's condition is not specific to quantum physics, nor does it depend on the quantum nature of a physical system so that it can be fulfilled. In consequence, Tolksdorf and Verch further conclude that Deutsch's condition isn't sufficiently specific to allow statements about time travel scenarios or their hypothetical realization by quantum physics, and that Deutsch's attempt to explain the possibility of his proposed time-travel scenario using the many-world interpretation of quantum mechanics is misleading.

An alternative proposal was later presented by Seth Lloyd based upon post-selection and path integrals. In particular, the path integral is over single-valued fields, leading to self-consistent histories.

See also 
 Quantum mechanics of time travel
 Cosmic censorship hypothesis
 Retrocausality
 Wormhole
 Tenet, a 2020 science-fiction film featuring temporal paradox

References

 
Time travel
Physical paradoxes
Causality
Thought experiments in physics